Polistes lanio is a species of paper wasp and one of several species in the subgenus Polistes (Aphanilopterus) known as a jack Spaniard wasp.

Distribution
This species occurs throughout South America and on Trinidad.

Subspecies
This species is divided into the following subspecies:

 Polistes lanio lanio 
 Polistes lanio satanulus 
 Polistes lanio weberi

References

lanio
Hymenoptera of South America
Insects described in 1775
Taxa named by Johan Christian Fabricius